NGC 6286 is an interacting spiral galaxy located in the constellation Draco. It is designated as Sb/P in the galaxy morphological classification scheme and was discovered by the American astronomer Lewis A. Swift on 13 August 1885. NGC 6286 is located at about 252 million light years away from Earth. NGC 6286 and NGC 6285 form a pair of interacting galaxies, with tidal distortions, categorized as Arp 293 in the Arp Atlas of Peculiar Galaxies.

Gallery

See also 
 List of NGC objects (6001–7000)
 List of NGC objects

References

External links 
 

10647
Spiral galaxies
Draco (constellation)
6286
Interacting galaxies
Luminous infrared galaxies
59352
293